Murray and Williams was an electoral district of the Legislative Council of Western Australia from 1874 to 1890, during the period when the Legislative Council was the sole chamber of the Parliament of Western Australia.

Murray and Williams was created by the Legislative Council Act Amendment Act 1873 (37 Vict. No. 22), along with the Northern District. It comprised parts of the districts of Fremantle and Wellington. The district included almost all of what is now called the Peel region, as well as areas of the Wheatbelt, South West, and Great Southern, with its eastern boundary being a portion of the Great Australian Bight coastline. Murray and Williams was bordered to the north by the districts of Fremantle, Perth, and York, and to the south by the district of Wellington.

Four men represented Murray and Williams in the Legislative Council between 1870 and 1890 – Samuel Hamersley, Septimus Burt, Theodore Fawcett, and William Paterson. Burt and Paterson went on to serve in the Legislative Assembly following the advent of responsible government in 1890.

Members

References

Murray and Williams
1874 establishments in Australia
1890 disestablishments in Australia